The Michigan Law Review is an American law review and the flagship law journal of the University of Michigan Law School.

History 
The Michigan Law Review was established in 1902, after Gustavus Ohlinger, a student in the Law Department (now the Law School) of the University of Michigan, approached the dean with a proposal for a law journal. The Michigan Law Review was originally intended as a forum in which the faculty of the Law Department could publish its legal scholarship. The faculty resolution creating the Michigan Law Review required every faculty member to submit two articles per year to the new journal.

From its inception until 1940, the Michigan Law Review'''s student members worked under the direction of faculty members who served as editor-in-chief. The first of these was Floyd Mechem, the last Paul Kauper. In 1940, the first student editor-in-chief was selected. During the years that followed, student editors were given increasing responsibility and autonomy; today, the Michigan Law Review is run with no faculty supervision. The current editor-in-chief is Dashaya Foreman. Day-to-day production operations are overseen by the current managing editor, Nia Vogel, and executive production editor, Michaela Olson. Seven of each volume's eight issues ordinarily are composed of two major parts: "Articles" by legal scholars and practitioners and "Notes" written by the student editors. One issue in each volume is devoted to book reviews. Occasionally special issues are devoted to symposia or colloquia.

 Rankings 
In 2016, PrawfsBlawg ranked the Michigan Law Review as the sixth best law journal by weighing its Google Scholar Metrics law journal ranking, US News Peer Reputation Ranking, US News Overall Ranking, and the W&L Combined Ranking. Based on data from 2009 through 2016, Washington and Lee University School of Law ranked the Michigan Law Review as the seventh best law journal. According to Google Scholar Metrics, the Michigan Law Review was the seventh best law journal in 2015 and the sixth best law journal in 2014.

According to Washington and Lee University School of Law's Law Library, the Michigan Law Review is the seventh most cited law journal in academic works, being cited in journals 3888 times between 2009 and 2016, and the sixth most cited law journal by courts, being cited in 128 cases between 2009 and 2016. As of 2012, the Michigan Law Review has published 4 of the 100 most cited law journal articles of all time—the fifth highest of any law journal. Of the 95 articles that constitute the 5 most cited law journal articles from each year between 1991 and 2009, 9 of them were published by the Michigan Law Review—the 5th most of any law journal.

 Significant articles 

 Notable alumni 

 Steven G. Bradbury, former head of the Office of Legal Counsel
 David W. Belin, assistant counsel to the Warren Commission
 Francis X. Beytagh, former dean, Ohio State University Moritz College of Law
 Charles Blakey Blackmar, former Chief Justice, Supreme Court of Missouri
 Michael T. Cahill, Dean of Brooklyn Law School
 Ann Coulter, conservative commentator, author, and syndicated columnist
 George E. Cryer, former mayor of Los Angeles
 David M. Ebel, judge, United States Court of Appeals for the Tenth Circuit
 Harry T. Edwards, former Chief Judge, United States Court of Appeals for the District of Columbia Circuit
 Heidi Li Feldman, law professor
 Jeffrey L. Fisher, Supreme Court litigator
 Heather K. Gerken, dean, Yale Law School
 Ronald Gould, judge, United States Court of Appeals for the Ninth Circuit
 Robert Jerry, dean of the University of Florida Levin College of Law
 Alex Joel, first Civil Liberties Protection Officer for the Office of the Director of National Intelligence
 Sally Katzen, former administrator of OIRA
 W. Wallace Kent, former judge, United States Court of Appeals for the Sixth Circuit
 Bob Kimball, former president and CEO of RealNetworks
 Dave Kopel, conservative pundit and blogger
 Jeffrey P. Minear, counselor to Supreme Court Chief Justice John Roberts.
 Ronald L. Olson, "name partner" in the Los Angeles office of the law firm of Munger, Tolles & Olson LLP
 Doug Pappas, baseball writer and researcher who was considered the foremost expert on the business of baseball
 John Porter, former United States Representative from Illinois
 Daniel Tarullo, member of the Board of Governors of the Federal Reserve System
 David Westin, President of ABC News
 James D. Zirin, lawyer, writer and cable TV talk show host

 Parody 
The Michigan Raw Review, a parody of the Michigan Law Review, was published annually by the Barristers Society, a self-styled honorary at the University of Michigan Law School. The Raw Review'' used the same cover, layout, and typeface, but contained content totally dissimilar, leaning to the "insulting and semi-pornographic".

References

Further reading

External links 
 

American law journals
General law journals
Publications established in 1902
University of Michigan
Monthly journals
English-language journals
1902 establishments in Michigan
Law journals edited by students
University of Michigan Law School